Wild Skin is a Canadian short drama film, directed by Ariane Louis-Seize and released in 2016. Without dialogue, the film stars Marilyn Castonguay as a woman who has a strange erotic experience after unexpectedly finding a python in her apartment.

The film premiered at the 2016 Toronto International Film Festival.

The film was a shortlisted Prix Iris nominee for Best Short Film at the 19th Quebec Cinema Awards. At the 5th Canadian Screen Awards, the film was shortlisted for Best Live Action Short Drama.

References

External links 
 

2016 short films
2016 drama films
Films directed by Ariane Louis-Seize
Canadian drama short films
2010s Canadian films